Fyffe Cobble is a mountain located in the Catskill Mountains of New York south of Delhi. Scotch Mountain is located north, and Devils Backbone is located east-northeast of Fyffe Cobble.

References

Mountains of Delaware County, New York
Mountains of New York (state)